Lalgarh Junction railway station is a main railway station in Bikaner district, Rajasthan. Its code is LGH. It serves the northern part of Bikaner city. The station consists of three platforms. The platforms are not well sheltered. It lacks many facilities including water and sanitation.

Major trains 

Some of the important trains that run from Lalgarh are:

 Kalka–Barmer Express
 Bhavnagar Terminus–Udhampur Janmabhoomi Express
 Barmer–Haridwar Link Express
 Jaisalmer–Lalgarh Express
 Ahmedabad–Jammu Tawi Express
 Avadh Assam Express
 Kalka–Barmer Express
 Delhi Sarai Rohilla–Bikaner Express (via Sri Ganganagar)
 Delhi Sarai Rohilla–Bikaner Superfast Express
 Bikaner–Delhi Sarai Rohilla Intercity Express
 Jaisalmer–Bikaner Express
 Kota–Shri Ganganagar Superfast Expres
 Leelan Express
 Shri Ganganagar–Tiruchichirappalli Humsafar Express
 Howrah–Jaisalmer Superfast Express

References

Railway stations in Bikaner district
Bikaner railway division
Railway junction stations in Rajasthan
Transport in Bikaner